Phaeacius wanlessi is a species of spider of the genus Phaeacius. It is native to Nepal and Sri Lanka.

References

Spiders described in 1991
Salticidae
Endemic fauna of Nepal
Spiders of Asia